The name Daylesford is borne by a number of settlements:

Daylesford, Victoria, Australia
Daylesford, Saskatchewan, in Rural Municipality of Lake Lenore No. 399, Canada
Daylesford, Gloucestershire, England
Daylesford, Pennsylvania, United States
Daylesford (SEPTA station), a commuter rail station

See also 
 Daylesford Abbey
 Daylesford Football Club
 Daylesford Monastery
 Daylesford Secondary College
 Daylesford Spa Country Railway
 Daylesford railway station
 Electoral district of Daylesford